St. Therese of Lisieux Church is a historic Catholic church in Louisville, Kentucky. It belongs to the Roman Catholic Archdiocese of Louisville. The church, along with the associated school and rectory, was added to the National Register of Historic Places in 1975.

The historic listing includes the St. Therese School, built in 1906–08, which is a plain brick building that is the oldest building of the complex.

References

External links

Churches on the National Register of Historic Places in Kentucky
Roman Catholic churches in Louisville, Kentucky
National Register of Historic Places in Louisville, Kentucky
1907 establishments in Kentucky